Colleen V. Chien is an American attorney and academic working as a law professor at Santa Clara University School of Law, where she teaches Patent Law, International Intellectual Property and Remedies.

Early life, education, and early career
Chien was born in Hartford, Connecticut, to immigrant parents from Taiwan. She earned a Bachelor of Arts and Bachelor of Science degree in engineering from Stanford University, followed by a Juris Doctor from the UC Berkeley School of Law.

Before becoming a professor, she worked as an attorney at the Silicon Valley law firm Fenwick & West and as an investigative journalist with the Philippine Center for Investigative Journalism as a Fulbright Scholar.

Career

From 2013 to 2015, she served as a senior advisor for intellectual property and innovation to Todd Park, the U.S. chief technology officer, in the White House's Office of Science and Technology Policy (OSTP). In that role, her projects included transferring green technology out of the federal government, using technology to improve education outcomes, making more federal government data available, open education resources, and technology cooperation with China.

Chien is best known for her patent scholarship, especially her work on patent “trolls” or patent assertion entities (PAEs). She coined the term PAE in a 2010 law review article, and many lawmakers subsequently adopted the term. She has published empirical studies on how patent litigation impacts startups and venture capitalists, and she has been a vocal proponent of reforming the patent system.

Chien founded the Paper Prisons initiative, which draws attention to the tens of millions of Americans unable to access employment, housing, voting, and resentencing opportunities available under the law, due to their past involvement with the criminal justice system. This project is based on her 2020 Michigan Law Review paper, America's Paper Prisons: The Second Chance Gap.

Chien has also worked on patent quality issues, including testifying before the Senate Judiciary Committee.

In 2020, Chien was named a volunteer member of the Joe Biden presidential transition Agency Review Team to support transition efforts related to the Department of Commerce.

Other activism projects she has been involved with include ActLocal and Wall of Us.

Awards
In 2017, the American Law Institute awarded her the "Young Scholar Medal," given every-other-year to "one or two outstanding early-career law professors." ALI said:

Other recognition she has received:

 In 2017, the California State Bar's IP Section designated her as an "IP Vanguard" (in the academic category).
 In 2013, Managing Intellectual Property magazine named her one of the "Top 50 IP Thought Leaders in the World" and said that her work has "led the debate in the US [on patent trolls] and been behind many of the recent proposals for reform."
 In 2013, she was awarded the inaugural Eric Yamamoto Emerging Scholar Award by the Board of the Conference of Asian Pacific American Law Faculty (CAPALF) 
 In 2013, she was named a Silicon Valley “Woman of Influence” by the Silicon Valley Business Journal, which called her "one of the most quotable and frequently consulted commentators on the patent system" and said she is "a leader in the national community of intellectual property scholars."

References 

Living people
American legal scholars
Santa Clara University School of Law faculty
American people of Taiwanese descent
American women lawyers
American lawyers
1973 births
UC Berkeley School of Law alumni
Stanford University alumni
American women academics
21st-century American women